Vansbro Municipality (Vansbro kommun) is a municipality in Dalarna County in central Sweden. Its seat is located in the town of Vansbro.

During the local government reform of 1971 Järna, Nås and Äppelbo were amalgamated to form the new Vansbro Municipality. The name was taken from the locality Vansbro, which also became the municipal seat.

The coat of arms show the sign of iron, an axe (symbolizing wood industries) and a sword.

Localities 
Vansbro, pop. 2,100
Järna, pop. 1,500
Nås, pop. 465
Äppelbo, pop. 261

History 

Many of the parishes and towns of today can be traced several centuries back. Around Järna has been found ovens from the Viking Age or older, showing that the town had been used in the processing of iron for a long time, and probably leading to its name (Järn means iron in Swedish).

Nås parish was mentioned in 1479, Järna parish in 1417, Äppelbo as Äppelboda parish 1417.

Äppelbo (literally "Apple Village") was in the 1690s the seat for the Västerdal regiment, Western Dalarnas regimente. Swedish warlike kings Charles XII and Gustaf IV Adolf made use of the men when they fought around in Europe.

Modern iron works were not established until the early 19th century, and had a short history that ended before the end of the century. The industry then became dominated by wood industry. Around the year 1900, three large saw mills were built in the town, making it prosper. With the railroad located through the town Vansbro in 1898, it further enhanced communications for industries.

Riksdag elections

Sister cities 
Its sister city is Velké Meziříčí, in the Czech Republic.

Notability 
In Järna one of the distinct Dalacarlia dialects are spoken.

References

External links

Vansbro Municipality – Official site

Municipalities of Dalarna County